Peter Ammann (born 5 February 1957) is a Swiss sprint canoer who competed in the early to mid-1980s. At the 1980 Summer Olympics in Moscow, he was eliminated in the repechages of the K-2 500 m event and the semifinals of the K-2 1000 m event. Four years later in Los Angeles, Ammann was eliminated in the repechages of the K-2 500 m event and the semifinals of the K-4 1000 m event.

References
Sports-Reference.com profile

1957 births
Canoeists at the 1980 Summer Olympics
Canoeists at the 1984 Summer Olympics
Living people
Olympic canoeists of Switzerland
Swiss male canoeists